The 2021 Pro14 Grand Final was the final rugby match of the 2020–21 Pro14 season. The 2020–21 season was the seventh with Guinness as the title sponsor and the twelfth with a grand final. Leinster won the match 16–6 to win their fourth successive league title and their eighth overall.

Route to the final

In a change from previous seasons, the 2020–21 Pro14 regular season was shortened to 16 rounds and, forgoing the usual play-offs, the teams finishing in the first place of each conference will advance straight to the final. These changes were made due to the creation of the Rainbow Cup, which will see four South African Super Rugby teams (the Bulls, Lions, Sharks and Stormers) join the twelve remaining Pro14 teams in a new tournament.

Irish province Munster became the first team to qualify for the final, after their 20–17 win against Connacht in round 14 gave them an unassailable 12 point lead at the top of conference B with two rounds remaining. Defending champions Leinster secured top spot in conference A with a 38–19 away win against Ulster, advancing to their fourth straight league final.

Pre-match
The match was televised free-to-air by TG4 in the Republic of Ireland. It was also shown on Eir Sport and on Premier Sports in the UK. It was shown on ESPN+ in the United States.

Final

Summary
In the first half, Ross Byrne kicked two penalties to put Leinster into a 6–0 lead after 11 minutes, before Joey Carbery then kicked two penalties for Munster to make the score 6–6 at half-time.
The only try of the match came in the 46th minute from Leinster's Jack Conan when he charged for the line after a scrum and got over on the third attempt. Ross Byrne converted the try and added a third penalty in the 69th minute to make the final score 16–6, it was the sixth win in a row for Leinster against Munster.

Details

Notes

References

2021
2020–21 Pro14
Leinster Rugby matches
Munster Rugby matches
Pro14 Grand Final